Valencia and its metropolitan area have a hot-summer Mediterranean climate (Köppen climate classification: Csa) with mild winters and warm to hot summers. According to Troll-Paffen climate classification, Valencia has a warm-temperate subtropical climate (Warmgemäßigt-subtropisches Zonenklima) and according to Siegmund/Frankenberg climate classification, Valencia has a subtropical climate.

Temperature

General 

Large fluctuations in temperature are rare.

Seasonal climate

Winter 
Winters in Valencia are mild. From a few to a dozen days in the winter, the temperature exceeds .

Summer 
Summers in Valencia area are warm to hot (in the middle of summer). The summer season ends normally around early October, as this month can see sometimes high temperatures below  normally by the end of the month.

Sunshine 
Sunshine duration is 2,696 hours per year, from 155 - average about 5 hours of sunshine a day in December to 314 - average above 10 hours of sunshine a day in July. This is a bit above average for the southern half of Europe because in this part of the continent, sunshine duration varies from about 2,000 to about 3,000 hours per year. However, this is a 70% larger value than in the northern half of Europe, where sunshine duration is around 1500 hours per year. In winter Valencia has about three times more sun duration than in the northern half of Europe.

Precipitation 
Valencia has on average only 46 precipitation days a year, averaging several rainy days per month (≥ 1 mm), ranging from 1 in July to 5 in October. The average annual precipitation is less than 454 mm (17.87 inches), ranging from 9 mm (0.35 inch) in July to 74 mm (2.91 inch) in October.

Humidity 
Average relative humidity is 65%, ranging from 60% in April to 68% in August.

Daylight 
Valencia enjoys one of the most optimal number of hours of daylight in Europe. Days in winter are not as short as in the northern part of the continent. The average hours of daylight in December, January and February is 10 hours (for comparison: London or Moscow or Warsaw - about 8 hours).

Mean maximums and minimums

Temperature extremes 
On May 14, 2015 an all-time high of 43 °C  was again recorded. In the month of August 2003, the average reported daytime maximum temperature was a record  (similar to a typical temperature in August of tropical Miami). Generally, February 1956 was the coldest month in the history of the city (since temperature recording).

Sea temperature 
From June to October, average temperature of sea exceed .

Climatic data for Valencia area

Curio 
Valencia has a similar latitude to Madrid. However, the climate of these Spanish cities is very different, as Valencia is located at the seaside; Madrid is located in the approximate middle of the inland plateau. Valencia has much warmer winters (data from January, the coldest month): 
and also Valencia has longer summers and milder temperatures in the middle of summer during the day.

See also 
Climate in other places in Iberian Peninsula:
 Climate of Spain
 Climate of Barcelona
 Climate of Bilbao
 Climate of Madrid
 Climate of Lisbon
 Climate of Gibraltar

References 

Valencia
Valencia
Valencia